Jerseyville may refer to:

Jerseyville, Illinois, United States
Jerseyville, New Jersey, United States
Jerseyville, Ontario, Canada
Jerseyville, New South Wales, Australia